Robert Anthony "Robin" Weiss (born 20 February 1940) is a British molecular biologist, Professor of Viral Oncology at University College London and a member of the Nuffield Council on Bioethics.

Research
His research has focussed on retroviruses, initially as a means of understanding T-cell leukemia and other cancers, which may be caused by retroviruses. A break-through discovery in 1971 was that the retroviral genome in chickens follows the rules of Mendelian inheritance. Later his work moved on to HIV, also a retrovirus, and made several new important discoveries, most notably identifying CD4 on lymphocytes as the binding receptor for HIV.

Career
Before becoming professor at UCL, Weiss was director at The Institute of Cancer Research, London, from 1980 until 1989, after which he continued as director of research for a further nine years.

Until 2005, Weiss was editor-in-chief of the British Journal of Cancer. His successor, A. L. Harris, states that Weiss showed "clear vision in developing the British Journal of Cancer into [a] multidisciplinary journal with a focus on research that aims to deliver benefits to cancer patients."

Awards and recognition
In 1977, Weiss was elected a member of the European Molecular Biology Organization. He became a Fellow of the Royal Society in 1997, and in 1999 he became an Honorary Fellow of the Royal College of Physicians.

In November 2001, the Royal Netherlands Academy of Arts and Sciences awarded Weiss the M. W. Beijerinck Prize for Virology, noting especially his work on retroviruses. In the same year, he delivered the Leeuwenhoek Lecture.

In 2007, Imperial College London awarded Weiss the Ernst Chain Prize, noting that he "has pioneered our understanding of HIV and AIDS, particularly on the identification of CD4 as the HIV receptor and on the analysis of neutralizing antibodies to the virus" 

Weiss was elected as Honorary Member of the Microbiology Society in 2009.
He is a member of the European Academy of Microbiology (EAM).
He was elected to the American Philosophical Society in 2018.

References

Living people
1940 births
British molecular biologists
British virologists
Fellows of the Royal Society
Academics of University College London
Academics of the Institute of Cancer Research
Members of the European Molecular Biology Organization
Members of the American Philosophical Society
Foreign associates of the National Academy of Sciences